Sergei Vadimovich Gorlukovich (born 18 November 1961) is a football manager and former player who played as defender. At international level, he represented the Soviet Union and Russia national teams.

Club career
In the last years of the Soviet Union transfer rules softened and Gorlukovich was allowed to move to West Germany in the winter of the 1989–90 season. His first club in the Bundesliga was Borussia Dortmund.

International career
In international football, Gorlukovich played at the 1990 and 1994 FIFA World Cups, and also in Euro 1996. He made his debut for USSR on 19 October 1988 in a 1990 FIFA World Cup qualifier against Austria. He scored his only national goal in a friendly against Syria on 21 November 1988.

He is also known for ruining the career of Marcel Peeper after a leg-breaking foul in a 1990 friendly with The Netherlands in Kiev.

Honours
Borussia Dortmund
 Bundesliga runner-up: 1991–92

Spartak-Alania Vladikavkaz
 Russian Premier League: 1995

Spartak Moscow
 Russian Premier League: 1996, 1997, 1998
 Russian Cup: 1997–98

Soviet Union
 Summer Olympics: 1988

References

External links
 
 
 
 RussiaTeam profile 
 Bundesliga career 

1961 births
Living people
People from Ashmyany District
Soviet footballers
Soviet Union international footballers
Russian footballers
Russia international footballers
Russian expatriate footballers
Belarusian footballers
Expatriate footballers in Germany
Dual internationalists (football)
Russian football managers
Russian Premier League players
Bundesliga players
2. Bundesliga players
FC Dinamo Minsk players
FC Lokomotiv Moscow players
Borussia Dortmund players
KFC Uerdingen 05 players
FC Spartak Vladikavkaz players
FC Spartak Moscow players
FC Moscow players
FC Sibir Novosibirsk players
FC Mika players
Olympic footballers of the Soviet Union
Olympic gold medalists for the Soviet Union
Footballers at the 1988 Summer Olympics
1990 FIFA World Cup players
1994 FIFA World Cup players
UEFA Euro 1996 players
Russian people of Belarusian descent
Expatriate footballers in Armenia
Soviet expatriate footballers
FC Lokomotiv Nizhny Novgorod players
FC Gomel players
Olympic medalists in football
Armenian Premier League players
FC Torpedo Mogilev players
FC SKA-Khabarovsk managers
Medalists at the 1988 Summer Olympics
Association football defenders
Sportspeople from Grodno Region
Soviet expatriate sportspeople in West Germany
Expatriate footballers in West Germany